Long Time Dead is a Torchwood tie-in novel by author Sarah Pinborough. It is the second of three prequels to Torchwood: Miracle Day, the final Torchwood TV series. It is published by BBC Books.

Pinborough says that she wrote for Torchwood because she was invited to do so. She also explains that as a TV tie-in, the novel is very dialogue-based which helped her in constructing it.

Plot synopsis
DCI Tom Cutler and the now Sergeant Andy Davidson return to investigate a series of deaths around the apparently defunct Torchwood Institute. It also features the return of Suzie Costello who misused the Resurrection Gauntlet in the first season.

References

2011 British novels
Novels by Sarah Pinborough
Torchwood
BBC Books books